Howdon depot is a light rail facility used by the Tyne and Wear Metro in Howdon, Tyne and Wear, England. The depot was built as a satellite depot of South Gosforth depot, which is being refurbished between 2020 and 2024. Construction on Howdon Depot completed in August 2020, with the first train entering in November 2020. The original intention was for Howdon to be a temporary depot, but future upgrades to the South Shields line, may mean the depot becomes permanent.

History
Howdon depot was built on a former landfill site in Howdon, North Tyneside. The new depot was built as part of a £362 million package which includes a new fleet of metrocars which will be partly commissioned at Howdon.

The new depot has the capacity to house 25% of the current metrocar fleet, which allows for a continuing service whilst the main depot at South Gosforth is upgraded. Although the groundbreaking ceremony was in June 2019,  the main construction phase on the facility was started in late 2019, with opening expected in July 2020, though this slipped until October 2020, when work at Gosforth depot started.

The depot, which is built on the former Riverside Branch (closed in 1973 and converted into a landfill site at Howdon) is equipped with ten storage roads. Howdon is to be capable of accepting, and assembling, the new fleet (to be built by Stadler), although this work could also be concentrated at South Gosforth, or shared between the two sites. Howdon has a maintenance shed with a single road and a pit underneath, and one shunt road adjacent to the mainline.

The depot at Howdon was conceived as a temporary solution whilst South Gosforth is upgraded. However, Nexus received £100 million from the UK Government as part of its Transforming Cities Fund in 2020, which will go to the Metro Flow project. If approved, this will mean the doubling of many single sections of track on the South Shields line and at Pelaw, Hebburn, Bede and Jarrow stations. If this does occur, then the depot at Howdon will become permanent.

References

External links

Railway depots in England
Transport infrastructure completed in 2020
Tyne and Wear Metro
2020 establishments in England